There are two formulas or equations named after Danish-American radio engineer Harald T. Friis
 Friis formulas for noise
 Friis transmission equation